Saroj Pandey (born 22 June 1968) is an Indian politician and a member of the Rajya Sabha, upper house of the Indian Parliament. She also served as National General Secretary of Bharatiya Janata Party. Prior to becoming Rajya Sabha MP, she was elected to 15th Lok Sabha from Durg and was also Member of Chhattisgarh Legislative Assembly.

Early life 
Saroj Pandey was born to Shyamji Pandey and Gulab Devi Pandey in 22 June 1968. She studied M.Sc. (Child Development) at Bhilai Mahila College, Pt. Ravishankar University, Raipur.

Political career 
Pandey was first elected as Mayor of Durg in 2000 and got re-elected in 2005. She got elected as the first MLA of Vaishali Nagar in 2008 and then BJP fielded her for 2009 Indian general election from Durg and she won and held post of Mayor, MLA and MP at same time. In 24 April 2013, she was appointed National President of BJP Mahila Morcha (woman wing of Bharatiya Janata Party). She lost 2014 Lok Sabha election to Tamradhwaj Sahu of Congress, but in spite of her defeat she was appointed National General Secretary of Bharatiya Janata Party and elected to Rajya Sabha in March 2018.

Pandey served as a general secretary and spokesperson of the party, then she held the position of National Secretary of BJP before taking charge as National President of BJP Mahila Morcha.

Awards and recognition 
Saroj is a holder of World record for holding the post of a Mayor, M.L.A. and M.P. at the same time and this record is nominated for Guinness Book of World Records and Limca Book of Records. She also holds the record for having longest term as a mayor from Durg, for continuous 10 years and has also received the Best Mayor award.

References

External links
Lok Sabha member biography - Saroj Panday

Women mayors of places in Chhattisgarh
India MPs 2009–2014
Living people
People from Durg district
Lok Sabha members from Chhattisgarh
National Democratic Alliance candidates in the 2014 Indian general election
Women members of the Lok Sabha
Bharatiya Janata Party politicians from Chhattisgarh
21st-century Indian women politicians
21st-century Indian politicians
1968 births
Mayors of places in Chhattisgarh
People from Durg
Chhattisgarh MLAs 2008–2013
Women members of the Chhattisgarh Legislative Assembly